Full Sail University is a private for-profit university in Winter Park, Florida. It was formerly a recording studio in Ohio named Full Sail Productions and Full Sail Center for the Recording Arts. The school moved to Florida in 1980 and began offering online degrees in 2007.

Full Sail is accredited by the Accrediting Commission of Career Schools and Colleges to award associate, bachelor's, and master's degrees in audio, design, computer animation and business. In November 2018, it had approximately 8,921 students at its Winter Park Campus, as well as 10,250 students enrolled in online courses.

History 

Full Sail University was founded by Jon Phelps in Dayton, Ohio, in 1979. Its curriculum was centered on recording arts and offered courses in audio engineering. It relocated to Orlando, Florida, in 1980 and added new courses to its core recording arts program. In 1989, Full Sail moved to its current location at Winter Park, Florida; the following year, it was accredited to grant specialized associate degrees.

Enrollment doubled between 1989 and 1991 at a time of increased interest in film and media studies. The university had financial difficulties in 1992 and its growth slowed. Between 1995 and 1999, it began offering associate degrees in computer animation, digital media, game design and development, and show production and touring; these were later expanded into full bachelor's degree programs.

In 2005, the school offered its first bachelor's degree program, a Bachelor of Science degree in entertainment business. In 2007, the first master's degree program—also in the entertainment industry—was offered. Online degree programs began in 2007, the first of which was an online adaptation of the existing Entertainment Business Master of Science.

The additions of the master's degree programs, among other factors, led to the school being recognized as a university by the state of Florida. In 2008 it changed its name from Full Sail Real World Education to Full Sail University after attaining university status from the Florida Department of Education's Commission for Independent Education. 

As the university grew between 2006 and 2011, the curriculum and degree programs were broadened, adding programs such as a Bachelor of Science in sports marketing and media, and a Master of Science degree in game design.

In 2012, WWE began filming episodes of its internet television show WWE NXT at Full Sail University. In June 2015, the school began hosting the WWE Tough Enough series. As part of the partnership between Full Sail and WWE, students have the opportunity to produce WWE NXT tapings, during which merchandise and tickets sales contribute to a scholarship fund for students enrolled at the university. As of January 2018, the partnership had resulted in $385,000 in scholarships. In September 2019, WWE and Full Sail University announced the expansion of their partnership. In 2020, it was announced that WWE NXT would stop taping at Full Sail University.

In 2015, the university announced a partnership with Wargaming and unveiled a user experience lab for conducting research projects.

Full Sail University's Dan Patrick School of Sportscasting was established in 2017, with a new sportscasting degree program and instruction provided by sportscaster and radio personality Dan Patrick.

Campus 

The university moved to Winter Park in 1989. The campus has soundstages, a film backlot, and 110 studios. An office building for teaching staff for the online degree program was leased in 2009.

In 2010, a new game studio was named "Blackmoor" (after a campaign in Dungeons & Dragons) in honor of Dave Arneson, who taught game design at the school from 1999 to 2008. In November 2010, in partnership with ESPN, the school opened a new laboratory for research and development in studio technologies. Two months later, approximately 200 Full Sail Online employees moved into the Gateway Center in Downtown Orlando. Also in 2011, the university announced plans to construct an  educational building to house 475 faculty and staff, additional film and television soundstages and classrooms; it was scheduled for completion in early 2012. In July 2011, Full Sail acquired Lakeview Office Park in Orlando.

In October 2018, Full Sail announced plans to construct an esports arena called "The Fortress". The 11,200-square-foot venue opened in May 2019, serves as home of Full Sail University's esports team, Armada.

In 2020, The Fortress was named a top-10 collegiate esports facility. It was also named one of the "15 Most Elite Universities for Pursuing Esports Careers in North America" in 2020. The Virtual Production Studio opened on the main campus in March 2022.

Academics 

Full Sail's academic degree programs are primarily focused on audio, film and media production, video game design, animation and other studies related to the media and entertainment industries. Full Sail began offering coursework in creating augmented reality (AR) and virtual reality (VR) projects in 2016, housed in the campus's Fabrication Lab.

Full Sail is accredited by the Accrediting Commission of Career Schools and Colleges (ACCSC). The college has been subject to criticism regarding limited transferability of credits.

Student outcomes
According to the College Scorecard, Full Sail has a 39 percent graduation rate. Median salary after attending ranges from $22,000 (BS in audio-visual communications technology) to $55,000 (BS in computer programming). Two years after entering repayment, the status of former students was 30% not making progress, 26% forbearance, 12% defaulted, 11% making progress, 9% deferment, 8% delinquent, 2% paid in full, 1% discharged.

Awards and rankings
In 1989, 1990, and 1991, the Full Sail Center for the Recording Arts won Mix magazine's outstanding institutional achievement award for recording schools.

In 2005, Rolling Stone called Full Sail "one of the five best music programs in the country".

The college was named FAPSC School/College of the Year (an award for which only career colleges in Florida were eligible) by the Florida Association of Postsecondary Schools and Colleges (FAPSC) in 2008, 2011, and 2014. Full Sail was recognized for its 21st-century best practices in distance learning by the United States Distance Learning Association (USDLA) in 2011, and was the recipient of New Media Consortium Center for Excellence Award in 2011 and 2015.

Full Sail's Game Design Master's degree has been ranked in The Princeton Review's Top 25 Graduate Program for Video Game Design since 2014. Full Sail also ranked in the top 50 in The Princeton Review's list of undergraduate programs for game design in 2021. TheWrap ranked Full Sail last place in their 2016, 2017, 2018, 2019 and 2020 lists of the "Top 50 Film Schools". In 2018, College Magazine ranked Full Sail number five in their list of the top 10 colleges for video game design. In January 2020, Animation Career Review ranked Full Sail University number 19 in their list of Top 50 Animation Schools in the US.

Notable alumni 

Christopher Aker, founder of Linode
 Mohammad Alavi, a video game designer who helped design levels, including "All Ghillied Up" and "No Russian", in the Call of Duty series.
Andy Anderson, record producer, songwriter, remixer
 Marcella Araica, audio and mixing engineer
 Michael Barber, rapper, musician, entrepreneur
J Beatzz (born Joshua Adams), record producer
Cheese (born Jason Goldberg), record producer and audio engineer 
 Corey Beaulieu, guitarist for the American heavy metal band Trivium
 Adam Best, entrepreneur, film producer, political activist, writer
 Brad Blackwood, Grammy and Pensado Award-winning mastering engineer
 Trayvon Bromell, Olympic Athlete, Track and Field
 Darren Lynn Bousman, film director and screenwriter
 Bre-Z (born Calesha Murray), actress on Empire (2015) and musician
 Collie Buddz (born Colin Harper), musician and singer
 Corrin Campbell, musician and singer
 Ryan Connolly, filmmaker, Internet celebrity, presenter
 Chad Crawford, television host
 Christine D'Clario, Christian music singer and songwriter
 Deraj (born Jared Wells), hip hop musician
 DJ Swivel (born Jordan Young), Grammy award-winning mixer, music producer, audio engineer
 Dylan Dresdow, audio engineer
 FKi 1st (born Trocon Roberts), record producer and disc jockey
 JD Harmeyer, producer, Howard Stern Show
 Michael Hicks, game designer, musician, programmer, writer
 London on da Track (born London Holmes), record producer and songwriter (attended)
 Mike Jaggerr, musician, producer, songwriter
Nels Jensen, record producer and audio engineer
Mokah Jasmine Johnson, social activist and politician
E. L. Katz Film director, producer and screenwriter 
 Sebastian Krys, Grammy winning audio engineer and record producer
 Ross Lara, audio engineer and record producer
 Ricardo Leite, footballer (attended, graduation unconfirmed)
 Machinedrum (born Travis Stewart), electronic music producer and performer
 Graham Marsh, record producer and recording engineer 
 William McDowell, gospel musician
 Steven C. Miller, film director, editor, and screenwriter
 Nathan Nance, Emmy award-winning sound mixer and engineer
Tre Nagella, Grammy award-winning American recording engineer, mixer and record producer 
 Brett Novak, director and filmmaker
 Susan Nwokedi, actress, filmmaker, producer
Offrami (born Rami Eid), music producer
 Nuh Omar, Pakistani filmmaker and marketer
 Jeff Pinilla, director, editor, producer
 Viktor Prokopenya, Technology Entrepreneur
 Gary Rizzo, Oscar winning audio engineer, re-recording mixer
 Andrés Saavedra, Latin Grammy award-winning producer
 Rafa Sardina, record producer and audio engineer
 Scott Stenzel, racing driver
 Karintha Styles, entertainment journalist 
 Phil Tan, Grammy winning audio engineer
Devvon Terrell, rapper and record producer 
 Terrell Grice, producer, singer-songwriter, YouTuber
 Alex Tumay, audio engineer and disc jockey
 Rocco Did It Again! (born Rocco Valdes), record producer and songwriter
 Stuart White, Grammy award winning recording/mixing engineer
 Adam Wingard, cinematographer, film director and editor
Alex Vincent, actor

Notable faculty 
Instructors at Full Sail have included Dungeons & Dragons co-creator Dave Arneson, who taught game design, and Stedman Graham. Other notable instructors include James Neihouse, cinematographer and lifetime member of the Academy, a 6,000-member group that votes on Oscar nominees. Former wrestler Ed Ferrera teaches the creative writing program.

References

External links 
 

1979 establishments in Florida
Animation schools in the United States
Buildings and structures in Winter Park, Florida
Educational institutions established in 1979
Film schools in Florida
For-profit music schools in the United States
For-profit universities and colleges in the United States
Universities and colleges in Orange County, Florida
Video game universities
Design schools in the United States
Art schools in the United States
Graphic design schools in the United States
Art schools in Florida
Digital media schools
Private universities and colleges in Florida